Annamária Király (born 29 August 1985) is a retired Hungarian team handball goalkeeper.

Achievements 

EHF Cup:
Semifinalist: 2006

References

External links 
 Career statistics on Worldhandball.com

1985 births
Living people
Sportspeople from Debrecen
Hungarian female handball players